Elena Gómez Servera (born November 14, 1985, in Manacor, Majorca, Spain) is a Spanish former artistic gymnast. Her best event was floor exercise. She is one of the best gymnasts that Spain has had in the history of this sport, being the only one to get a gold medal in a world championship.

Career

Junior career
At the 2000 Junior European Championships, Gomez placed 6th in both the team final and the individual all-around final.

Senior career
Gomez made her senior debut in 2001. At the 2001 World Championships in Ghent, Belgium, Gomez and the Spanish team placed 4th in the team final. Individually, Gomez placed 17th in the all-around final and 6th in the balance beam final.

Gomez attended the 2002 European Championships. Here she placed 7th in the all-around, 6th on vault, 8th on balance beam and 4th on floor exercise. Later that year at the 2002 World Championships in Debrecen, Hungary Gomez won the floor exercise final. Gomez was the first-ever Spanish female gymnast to win a World title in Women's Artistic Gymnastics.

The following year, Gomez attended the 2003 World Championships in Anaheim, California. Here, the Spanish team placed 5th, therefore qualifying a full team to the 2004 Summer Olympics. She won bronze the medal in floor exercise the following year in Anaheim using the same routine with the score of 9.675. Additionally, Gomez placed 5th in both the all-around final and the balance beam final.

In 2004 Gomez competed at the 2004 European Championships. Here, the Spanish team placed 4th. Individually, Gomez placed 5th in the all-around, and won a silver medal on the floor exercise. Gomez was named to the Spanish team for the 2004 Summer Olympics where she placed 8th in the all-around. The Spanish team placed 5th.

Post-retirement and personal life
Gómez announced that she was retiring from the sport in 2006, following injuries sustained in training. She has three sisters, notably the younger: Natalia, also known as guitarist of the rock band Puja Fasua.

Eponymous skill
Gómez has one eponymous skill listed in the Code of Points.

Floor music
2001-2002: "Mozart L'Egyptien: Mawwall" by Milen Natchev & the Bulgarian Symphonic Orchestra

2002-2004: "Jump Up Boogie" by Charlie Normal and Robert Wells

2004: "Respirando" by Ana Belen

References

1985 births
Living people
Spanish female artistic gymnasts
Sportspeople from Manacor
Medalists at the World Artistic Gymnastics Championships
World champion gymnasts
Originators of elements in artistic gymnastics
Olympic gymnasts of Spain
Gymnasts at the 2004 Summer Olympics
Mediterranean Games gold medalists for Spain
Mediterranean Games bronze medalists for Spain
Mediterranean Games medalists in gymnastics
Competitors at the 2001 Mediterranean Games
21st-century Spanish women